Anagyris (Spanish: oro de risco) is a genus of flowering plants in the family Fabaceae. It belongs to the subfamily Faboideae.

Species
Anagyris comprises the following species:

 Anagyris foetida L.
 Anagyris latifolia Brouss. ex Willd. Almost extinct, this plant has trifoliate leaves and can be found in Gran Canaria.

Species names with uncertain taxonomic status
The status of the following species is unresolved:
 Anagyris chinensis Spreng.
 Anagyris cretica Mill.
 Anagyris glauca Loudon
 Anagyris inodora Lour.
 Anagyris neapolitana Ten.
 Anagyris sinensis Steud.

Gallery

References

 
Fabaceae genera